Plaesiomys is a genus of extinct lamp shells belonging to the family Plaesiomyidae.

Fossil record
Fossils of Plaesiomys are found in marine strata of the Ordovician (age range: from 466.0 to 443.7 years ago.) of Canada, China, Europe and United States.

Species
†Plaesiomys anticostiensis (Shaler, 1865)
†Plaesiomys bellistriatus Wang, 1949
†Plaesiomys carletona Twenhofel, 1928
†Plaesiomys fidelis Popov et al., 2000
†Plaesiomys iphigenia (Billings, 1865)
†Plaesiomys multiplicata Bancroft, 1945
†Plaesiomys porcata (McCoy, 1846)
†Plaesiomys proavitus Winchell and Schuchert, 1892
†Plaesiomys rockymontana Wilson, 1926
†Plaesiomys saxbiana Oraspold, 1959
†Plaesiomys subquadrata (Hall, 1847)

References

Prehistoric brachiopod genera
Rhynchonellata
Paleozoic life of Ontario
Verulam Formation
Paleozoic life of British Columbia
Paleozoic life of Manitoba
Paleozoic life of the Northwest Territories
Paleozoic life of Nunavut
Paleozoic life of Quebec